Area codes 619 and 858 are telephone area codes in the North American Numbering Plan (NANP) for most of San Diego County in the U.S. state of California.

Area code 619 was created by a split from area code 714 in 1982, and was the first new area code in California since 707 was added in 1959. Its original numbering plan area was almost all of the southernmost portion of California, from San Diego to the Nevada border.

On March 23, 1997, most of outer northern San Diego County, desert areas and geographical areas in southeastern California split into 760. On June 12, 1999, the northern half of San Diego and the inner northern suburbs split into area code 858. In June 2000, the southern and eastern parts of the county were to split into area code 935, but that split was suspended indefinitely due to popular and political opposition.

In response to projections that 619 would exhaust in March 2019, the California Public Utilities Commission approved a relief plan that "erased" the 619/858 boundary, turning 619 and 858 into overlay codes for all of the inner portion of San Diego County. This change took effect in June 2018; at that time, 10-digit local calling became mandatory. At the time, 858 was not projected to exhaust for at least 30 years, despite North County's continued explosive growth. Under the most recent projections, San Diego will not need another area code until 2043 at the earliest.

Service area
The service area include the following cities and communities:

4S Ranch
Alpine
Bonita
Bostonia
Boulevard
Campo
Carmel Mountain Ranch
Carmel Valley
Casa de Oro-Mount Helix
Chula Vista
Clairemont
Coronado
Crest
Del Mar
Descanso
Dulzura
El Cajon
Granite Hills
Harbison Canyon
Imperial Beach
Jacumba
Jamul
Kearny Mesa
La Jolla
La Mesa
La Presa
Lakeside
Lemon Grove
Lincoln Acres
Linda Vista
Miramar
Mira Mesa
Mission Beach
Mount Laguna
National City
Ocean Beach
Pacific Beach
Pine Valley
Potrero
Poway
Rancho Bernardo
Rancho Peñasquitos
Rancho San Diego
Rancho Santa Fe
Sabre Springs
San Diego
Santee
San Ysidro
Scripps Ranch
Serra Mesa
Solana Beach
Sorrento Valley
Spring Valley
Tecate
Tierrasanta
University City
Winter Gardens

 Communities that are mostly or entirely within the City of San Diego

 Incorporated cities within San Diego County

In popular culture
 Professional wrestler and San Diego native Rey Mysterio named his finishing move "The 619" after the area code. A DVD featuring him is titled Rey Mysterio: 619. His entrance theme is called "Booyaka 619" and is performed by fellow San Diego natives P.O.D.
 Football player Reggie Bush painted the number 619 into his eyeblack during games. He explained "When I do that, it's my way of keeping myself humble, of representing my hometown and letting them know I'm not going to forget where I came from."
The switch of 619 to 858 was referenced in the song "Area Code" by Steve Poltz.

See also
List of California area codes
List of NANP area codes
North American Numbering Plan

References

External links

619 and 858
San Diego County, California
La Jolla, San Diego
Poway, California
San Diego
619 and 858